The Faculty of Medicine of Al-Baath University was founded in 1996 in the city of Homs, Syria.

An approximate number of 500 students are added each year.

Faculty Departments

- Anatomy, Histology & Embryology.

- Physiology.

- Pharmacology.

- Pathology.

- Family Medicine.

- Radiology.

- Dermatology.

- Internal Medicine.

- Surgery.

- Pediatrics.

- Obstetrics & Gynecology.

- ENT.

- Oncology.

- Ophthalmology.

- Anasthiology.

- Forensic Medicine.

- Laboratory Medicine.

11 departments had been opened until now.

International Recognition
 The Faculty of Medicine of Al-Baath University is listed in the World Health Organization's Avicenna directory.
 The Faculty of Medicine of Al-Baath University is listed in the ECFMG IMED/FAIMER database of medical schools.

Gallery

External links
 Al-Baath University

References

Buildings and structures in Homs
Al-Baath University
Schools of medicine in Syria